Charvak may refer to the following:

Charvaka, a system of Indian philosophy
Lake Charvak, an artificial lake in Uzbekistan
 Charvak, a journalist, activist and professor in India. See Charvak Mukhopadhyay